Haemaphysalis is a genus of ticks, containing these species:

Haemaphysalis aborensis Warburton, 1913
Haemaphysalis aciculifer Warburton, 1913
Haemaphysalis aculeata Lavarra, 1904
Haemaphysalis adleri Feldman-Muhsam, 1951
Haemaphysalis anomala Warburton, 1913
Haemaphysalis anomaloceraea Teng & Cui, 1984
Haemaphysalis anoplos Hoogstraal, Uilenberg & Klein, 1967
Haemaphysalis aponommoides Warburton, 1913
Haemaphysalis asiatica (Supino, 1897)
Haemaphysalis atheruri Hoogstraal, Trapido & Kohls, 1965
Haemaphysalis bancrofti Nuttall & Warburton, 1915
Haemaphysalis bandicota Hoogstraal & Kohls, 1965
Haemaphysalis bartelsi Schulze, 1938
Haemaphysalis bequaerti Hoogstraal, 1956
Haemaphysalis birmaniae Supino, 1897
Haemaphysalis bispinosa Neumann, 1897
Haemaphysalis bochkovi Apanaskevich & Tomlinson, 2019
Haemaphysalis borneata Hoogstraal, 1971
Haemaphysalis bremneri Roberts, 1963
Haemaphysalis burkinae Apanaskevich & Tomlinson, 2019
Haemaphysalis calcarata Neumann, 1902
Haemaphysalis calva Nuttall & Warburton, 1915
Haemaphysalis campanulata Warburton, 1908
Haemaphysalis canestrinii (Supino, 1897)
Haemaphysalis capricornis Hoogstraal, 1966
Haemaphysalis caucasica Olenev, 1928
Haemaphysalis celebensis Hoogstraal, Trapido & Kohls, 1965
Haemaphysalis chordeilis (Packard, 1869)
Haemaphysalis colasbelcouri (Santos Dias, 1958)
Haemaphysalis concinna Koch, 1844
Haemaphysalis cooleyi Bedford, 1929
Haemaphysalis cornigera Neumann, 1897
Haemaphysalis cornupunctata Hoogstraal & Varma, 1962
Haemaphysalis cuspidata Warburton, 1910
Haemaphysalis dangi Phan Trong, 1977
Haemaphysalis danieli Černý & Hoogstraal, 1977
Haemaphysalis darjeeling Hoogstraal & Dhanda, 1970
Haemaphysalis davisi Hoogstraal, Dhanda & Bhat, 1970
Haemaphysalis demidovae Emel’yanova, 1978
Haemaphysalis doenitzi Warburton & Nuttall, 1909
Haemaphysalis elliptica (Koch, 1844)
Haemaphysalis elongata Neumann, 1897
Haemaphysalis erinacei Pavesi, 1884
Haemaphysalis eupleres Hoogstraal, Kohls & Trapido, 1965
Haemaphysalis filippovae Bolotin, 1979
Haemaphysalis flava Neumann, 1897
Haemaphysalis formosensis Neumann, 1913
Haemaphysalis fossae Hoogstraal, 1953
Haemaphysalis fujisana Kitaoka, 1970
Haemaphysalis galidiae Apanaskevich & Goodman, 2020
Haemaphysalis garhwalensis Dhanda & Bhat, 1968
Haemaphysalis goral Hoogstraal, 1970
Haemaphysalis grochovskajae Kolonin, 1992
Haemaphysalis heinrichi Schulze, 1939
Haemaphysalis hirsuta Hoogstraal, Trapido & Kohls, 1966
Haemaphysalis hispanica Gil Collado, 1938
Haemaphysalis hoodi Warburton & Nuttall, 1909
Haemaphysalis hoogstraali Kohls, 1950
Haemaphysalis horaki Apanaskevich & Tomlinson, 2019
Haemaphysalis houyi Nuttall & Warburton, 1915
Haemaphysalis howletti Warburton, 1913
Haemaphysalis humerosa Warburton & Nuttall, 1909
Haemaphysalis hylobatis Schulze, 1933
Haemaphysalis hyracophila Hoogstraal, Walker & Neitz, 1971
Haemaphysalis hystricis Supino, 1897
Haemaphysalis ias Nakamura & Yajima, 1937
Haemaphysalis indica Warburton, 1910
Haemaphysalis indoflava Dhanda & Bhat, 1968
Haemaphysalis inermis Birula, 1895
Haemaphysalis intermedia Warburton & Nuttall, 1909
Haemaphysalis japonica Warburton, 1908
Haemaphysalis juxtakochi Cooley, 1946
Haemaphysalis kadarsani Hoogstraal & Wassef, 1977
Haemaphysalis kashmirensis Hoogstraal & Varma, 1962
Haemaphysalis kinneari Warburton, 1913
Haemaphysalis kitaokai Hoogstraal, 1969
Haemaphysalis koningsbergeri Warburton & Nuttall, 1909
Haemaphysalis kopetdaghica Kerbabaev, 1962
Haemaphysalis kutchensis Hoogstraal & Trapido, 1963
Haemaphysalis kyasanurensis Trapido, Hoogstraal & Rajagopalan, 1964
Haemaphysalis lagostrophi Roberts, 1963
Haemaphysalis lagrangei Larrousse, 1925
Haemaphysalis laocayensis Phan Trong, 1977
Haemaphysalis leachi (Audouin, 1826)
Haemaphysalis lemuris Hoogstraal, 1953
Haemaphysalis leporispalustris (Packard, 1869)
Haemaphysalis lobachovi Kolonin, 1995
Haemaphysalis longicornis Neumann, 1901
Haemaphysalis luzonensis Hoogstraal & Parrish, 1968
Haemaphysalis madagascariensis Colas-Belcour & Millot, 1948
Haemaphysalis mageshimaensis Saito & Hoogstraal, 1973
Haemaphysalis megalaimae Rajagopalan, 1963
Haemaphysalis megaspinosa Saito, 1969
Haemaphysalis menglaensis Pang, Chen & Xiang, 1982
Haemaphysalis minuta Kohls, 1950
Haemaphysalis mjoebergi Warburton, 1926
Haemaphysalis montgomeryi Nuttall, 1912
Haemaphysalis moreli Camicas, Hoogstraal & El Kammah, 1972
Haemaphysalis moschisuga Teng, 1980
Haemaphysalis muhsamae Santos Dias, 1954
Haemaphysalis nadchatrami Hoogstraal, Trapido & Kohls, 1965
Haemaphysalis nepalensis Hoogstraal, 1962
Haemaphysalis nesomys Hoogstraal, Uilenberg & Klein, 1966
Haemaphysalis norvali Hoogstraal & Wassef, 1983
Haemaphysalis novaeguineae Hirst, 1914
Haemaphysalis obesa Larrousse, 1925
Haemaphysalis obtusa Dönitz, 1910
Haemaphysalis orientalis Nuttall & Warburton, 1915
Haemaphysalis ornithophila Hoogstraal & Kohls, 1959
Haemaphysalis palawanensis Kohls, 1950
Haemaphysalis papuana Thorell, 1883
Haemaphysalis paraleachi Camicas, Hoogstraal & El Kammah, 1983
Haemaphysalis paraturturis Hoogstraal, Trapido & Rebello, 1963
Haemaphysalis parmata Neumann, 1905
Haemaphysalis parva Neumann, 1897
Haemaphysalis pavlovskyi Pospelova-Shtrom, 1935
Haemaphysalis pedetes Hoogstraal, 1972
Haemaphysalis pentalagi Pospelova-Shtrom, 1935
Haemaphysalis petrogalis Roberts, 1970
Haemaphysalis phasiana Saito, Hoogstraal & Wassef, 1974
Haemaphysalis pospelovashtromae Hoogstraal, 1966
Haemaphysalis primitiva Teng, 1982
Haemaphysalis psalistos Hoogstraal, Kohls & Parrish, 1967
Haemaphysalis punctaleachi Camicas, Hoogstraal & El Kammah, 1973
Haemaphysalis punctata Canestrini & Fanzago, 1878
Haemaphysalis qinghaiensis Teng, 1980
Haemaphysalis quadriaculeata Kolonin, 1992
Haemaphysalis ramachandrai Dhanda, Hoogstraal & Bhat, 1970
Haemaphysalis ratti Kohls, 1948
Haemaphysalis renschi Schulze, 1933
Haemaphysalis roubaudi Toumanoff, 1940
Haemaphysalis rugosa Santos Dias, 1956
Haemaphysalis rusae Kohls, 1950
Haemaphysalis sambar Hoogstraal, 1971
Haemaphysalis sciuri Kohls, 1950
Haemaphysalis semermis Neumann, 1901
Haemaphysalis shimoga Trapido & Hoogstraal, 1964
Haemaphysalis silacea Robinson, 1912
Haemaphysalis silvafelis Hoogstraal & Trapido, 1963
Haemaphysalis simplex Neumann, 1897
Haemaphysalis simplicima Hoogstraal & Wassef, 1979
Haemaphysalis sinensis Zhang, 1981
Haemaphysalis spinigera Neumann, 1897
Haemaphysalis spinulosa Neumann, 1906
Haemaphysalis subelongata Hoogstraal, 1953
Haemaphysalis subterra Hoogstraal, El Kammah & Camicas, 1992
Haemaphysalis sulcata Canestrini & Fanzago, 1878
Haemaphysalis sumatraensis Hoogstraal, El Kammah, Kadarsan & Anastos, 1971
Haemaphysalis sundrai Sharif, 1928
Haemaphysalis suntzovi Kolonin, 1993
Haemaphysalis susphilippensis Hoogstraal, Kohls & Parrish, 1968
Haemaphysalis taiwana Sugimoto, 1936
Haemaphysalis tauffliebi Morel, 1965
Haemaphysalis theilerae Hoogstraal, 1953
Haemaphysalis tibetensis Hoogstraal, 1965
Haemaphysalis tiptoni Hoogstraal, 1953
Haemaphysalis toxopei Warburton, 1927
Haemaphysalis traguli Oudemans, 1928
Haemaphysalis traubi Kohls, 1955
Haemaphysalis turturis Nuttall & Warburton, 1915
Haemaphysalis verticalis Itagaki, Noda & Yamaguchi, 1944
Haemaphysalis vidua Warburton & Nuttall, 1909
Haemaphysalis vietnamensis Hoogstraal & Wilson, 1966
Haemaphysalis walkerae Apanaskevich & Tomlinson, 2019
Haemaphysalis warburtoni Nuttall, 1912
Haemaphysalis wellingtoni Nuttall & Warburton, 1908
Haemaphysalis xinjiangensis Teng, 1980
Haemaphysalis yeni Toumanoff, 1944
Haemaphysalis zumpti Hoogstraal & El Kammah, 1974

Extinct species 

 †Haemaphysalis cretacea Chitimia-Dobler, Pfeffer & Dunlop, 2018 Burmese amber, Myanmar, Cenomanian ~99 million years ago.

References

Ticks
Ixodidae